The Book of Sulaym ibn Qays is the oldest known Shia hadith collection. It was attributed to Sulaym ibn Qays al-Hilali (died 678), who purportedly entrusted it to Aban ibn Abi Ayyash.

Scholars consider the attribution of this work to Sulaym ibn Qays, who himself may have been a legendary figure, to be false.

The precise dating of the work is not clear. Hossein Modarressi dates the original core of this work to the final years of Hisham ibn Abd al-Malik's reign, which would make it one of the oldest Islamic books that are still extant. However, it contains many later additions and alterations of unknown date, which may render it impossible to reconstruct the original text. Two individual passages which have been the subject of a case study have been dated to c. 762-780 and to the late 8th/early 9th century, respectively.

Views of medieval scholars
Sources indicate that the book was well known, but not always held in high esteem. Ibn al-Nadim (d. 995) said that the book was among the well-known Shia books, and Mohammad-Baqer Majlesi mentioned the book and the author in his book, Al-Ghaibah.

However, the scholars Ahmad ibn Ubayda (d. 941) and Abu Abd Allah al-Ghadhanfari (d. 1020) considered the book to be unreliable on the basis of three factors: a segment in the book indicates there were thirteen Imams instead of the traditionally held twelve; another segment states that Muhammad ibn Abi Bakr rebuked his dying father Abu Bakr despite Muhammad being a three-year-old child; and the book was purportedly transmitted by Aban ibn Abi Ayyash at a time when the latter was only fourteen years old.

Al-Shaykh Al-Mufid (d. 1022) noted: "This book (Kitab Sulaym) is not reliable, and it is not permissible to act upon most of it, and confusion and tadlees has occurred in it, so the pious should not act upon everything that is in it (at all), and not rely on what is written in it or imitate its narrations."

Dating
Currently, several variant manuscripts of this book exist, and it has been suggested that content was added to it and altered in it over time.

An analysis of a tafsir-related passage suggests that this passage dates to the early 9th century, or perhaps the late 8th century CE.

References

Works cited

External links
 English Translation of Kitab al-Sulaym ibn Qays
 

Shia literature
Hadith
Hadith studies
Hadith collections
Shia hadith collections
8th-century Arabic books
9th-century Arabic books
Shia bibliography